Kari Økland (born 16 December 1955 in Bergen) is a Norwegian politician for the Christian Democratic Party.

She was elected to the Norwegian Parliament from Nordland in 1997, but was not re-elected in 2001. Instead she served in the position of deputy representative during the term 2001–2005.

Økland was involved in local politics in Hemnes municipality council from 1983 to 1995.

References

1955 births
Living people
Christian Democratic Party (Norway) politicians
Members of the Storting
Women members of the Storting
21st-century Norwegian politicians
21st-century Norwegian women politicians
20th-century Norwegian politicians
20th-century Norwegian women politicians